A song is a musical composition for voice or voices.

Song(s) or The Song may also refer to:

Animal vocalizations
 Bird song, a type of bird vocalization
 Whale vocalization of some whales

Types of music
 An arrangement (music)
 A vocal performance (music)
 A recorded track
 Song cycle, a group of individually complete songs performed as a unit

Places
 Song, Nigeria, an area in Nigeria
 Song, Malaysia, the capital of the Song District in Malaysia
 Mount Song, in Henan, China
 Song County, in Henan, China
 Song district, in Phrae Province, Thailand

People with the name
 Song (Chinese surname), a romanization of the Chinese surname 
 Song (Korean surname), romanization of the Korean surname  (宋, 松, or 訟)
 Song, a variant romanization of the Chinese surname Cháng 
 Song, an African surname
 Alex Song (born 1987), Cameroonian footballer and nephew of Rigobert Song
 Rigobert Song (born 1976), Cameroonian footballer
 Brenda Song (born 1988), Hmong American actress

Arts, entertainment, and media

Films
 The Song (2014 film), a 2014 American film
 The Song, also known as Geet, a 1944 Bollywood film

Literature
 "Song", a poem by English poet John Donne
A Song of Ice and Fire, a series of fantasy novels by George R.R. Martin
 Song of Songs, a book of the Hebrew Bible, also referred to Song of Solomon
 Song poem, song lyrics that have been set to music for a fee, in 20th Century North America
 Song poetry, poetry during the Chinese Song Dynasty (960–1279)

Albums
 Song (Lullaby for the Working Class album), 2012
Song (It's Immaterial album)
 Song, an LP from the Classics IV, 1970
 A Song (Neil Sedaka album), 1977
 A Song, album by Pablo Moses 1980
 Songs (Admiral Freebee album), 2005
 Songs (Luther Vandross album), 1994
 Songs (Regina Spektor album), 2002
 Songs (Rich Mullins album), 1996
 Songs (Kate Micucci EP), 2008
 Songs (Rusko album), 2012
 Songs (Fra Lippo Lippi album), 1985
 Songs (Rotary Connection album), 1969
 Songs (Spiers and Boden album), 2005
 Songs (Willie Nelson album), 2005
 Songs (Plácido Domingo album), 2012
 Songs (John Maus album), 2006
 Songs (Adrianne Lenker album), 2020

Songs
 "Song Number 1", a song by Serebro and Russia's entry in the Eurovision 2007 Song Contest
 "Song 2", a 1997 song by Blur
 Songs (Stan Brakhage cycle)
 "Song", by Avail from their album Dixie
 "Songs", by Helen Reddy from her album Love Song for Jeffrey
 "Song", by Theo Tams
 "Song", by the 3rd and the Mortal from their album Tears Laid in Earth

Chinese history
 Song (state) (宋) (11th century–286 BC), a state during the Spring and Autumn period
 Liu Song dynasty (劉宋) (420–479), the first of the Southern dynasties during the Northern and Southern dynasties period
 Song (宋) (623–624), a short-lived state established by Fu Gongshi during the Sui–Tang transition
 Song dynasty (宋朝) (960–1279), an imperial dynasty of China
 Northern Song (960–1127) (北宋) (960–1127)
 Southern Song (南宋) (1127–1279)
 Song (宋) (1351–1360), also called "Tianwan" (天完), a state established by Xu Shouhui
 Song (宋) (1355–1366), a state established by Han Lin'er; see Red Turban Rebellions

Transportation
 Song (airline), a former low-fare airline in the United States
 Song-class submarine, a class of diesel-electric submarines of the People's Liberation Army Navy
 BYD Song, a car named after the Song dynasty

Other uses
 Ming (typefaces), also known as "Song typeface"
 SONGS, the acronym for the San Onofre Nuclear Generating Station

See also
This Song (disambiguation)
Two Songs (disambiguation)
3 Songs (disambiguation)
4 Songs (disambiguation)
5 Songs (disambiguation) 
Song of Solomon (disambiguation)